Stephen Marc Akers (born 20 September 1988 in Derby) is an English footballer who plays for Hollywood United Hitmen in the USL Premier Development League.

Career

England
Akers was a trainee at English League Two side Notts County, and played extensively in the team's youth system before making the step up to the senior side in 2006. He made his professional debut for County on 17 October 2006 in a Football League Trophy game against Barnet. He spent the rest of the 2006–07 season on loan at non-League Hucknall Town, and went on to make 15 appearances in the Conference North. He scored his first career goal for Hucknall on 20 January 2007, in a 5–0 victory over Lancaster City.

He was voted Notts County's Youth Team Most Improved Player of the Year in 2007, but despite this never featured for the County first team again, and was released at the end of the 2007–08 season.

North America
Akers moved across the Atlantic to the United States in 2010 when he signed with the Hollywood United Hitmen of the USL Premier Development League. He made his debut for the Hitmen on 28 May 2010, in a 3–1 victory over Ventura County Fusion.

References

External links

1988 births
Living people
English footballers
Notts County F.C. players
Hucknall Town F.C. players
Hollywood United Hitmen players
USL League Two players
English expatriate footballers
Footballers from Derby
Association football forwards
English expatriate sportspeople in the United States
Expatriate soccer players in the United States